Fernando Chamorro may refer to:
Fernando Chamorro Alfaro, 19th century Nicaraguan general
Fernando "El Negro" Chamorro, Nicaraguan rebel fighting both the Somoza and Sandinista regimes